Richard Samuel Ward FRS (born 6 September 1951) is a British mathematical physicist. He is a Professor of Mathematical & Theoretical Particle Physics at the University of Durham.

Work  
Ward earned his Ph.D. from the University of Oxford in 1977, under the supervision of Roger Penrose. He is most famous for his extension of Penrose's twistor theory to nonlinear cases, which he with Michael Atiyah used to describe instantons by vector bundles on the three-dimensional complex projective space. He has related interests in the theory of monopoles, topological solitons and skyrmions.

Honors and awards
Ward was awarded the Whitehead Prize in 1989 for his work in mathematical physics. He was elected as a fellow of the Royal Society of London in 2005. His certificate of election reads:

Bibliography

Books
 Twistor geometry and field theory (with Raymond O. Wells Jr), Cambridge University Press 1990
 Integrable systems: twistors, loop groups, and Riemann surfaces (with Nigel Hitchin, Graeme Segal), Oxford, Clarendon Press 1999

Selected academic works
.
.
.

References

Academics of Durham University
Fellows of the Royal Society
Living people
1951 births